Torsten Lennart Back (28 May 1933 – 1 August 2022) was a Swedish race walker. He won a bronze medal in the 20 km event at the 1958 European Championships and finished sixth at the 1960 Summer Olympics.

He was the silver medallist at the inaugural 1961 IAAF World Race Walking Cup and represented Sweden again at that competition in 1963, 1965 and 1970 (though not winning a medal those times).

References

1933 births
2022 deaths
People from Färgelanda Municipality
Swedish male racewalkers
Olympic athletes of Sweden
Athletes (track and field) at the 1960 Summer Olympics
European Athletics Championships medalists
Sportspeople from Västra Götaland County
20th-century Swedish people
21st-century Swedish people